Rossana Nájera Flores (born February 14, 1980, in Xalapa, Veracruz) is a Mexican actress of soap operas. She studied acting in  Centro de Formacion Actoral of TV Azteca.

Filmography

References

External links 

1980 births
Living people
Mexican telenovela actresses
Actresses from Veracruz
People from Xalapa
People educated at Centro de Estudios y Formación Actoral